(lit. 'reader') or the Reader movement was a Swedish Pietistic Christian revival movement of people who stressed the importance of reading, that is, reading the Bible and other Christian literature. It was influenced by both the Herrnhuters (Moravian Church) and the Methodists and has been described by scholar George M. Stephenson as a "second religious reformation in Sweden".

Term and beliefs 
There are several spiritual phenomena referred to by the term . It was first used, pejoratively, in the 1750s for Lutherans who sought priests "for whom religion was an inner personal matter" and held individual prayer meetings despite the Conventicle Act banning individual religious gatherings without the leadership of a priest of the Church of Sweden. This  ('old reading') was influenced by the literalism of Pietism, especially in the 18th century. Lutheran priest Pehr Brandell was one influential revivalist preacher who grew up in an Old Reader environment.

The term also later came to refer to revivalists such as Mårten Thunberg, a priest whose meetings featured ecstatic fits and prophesying.

The 19th-century reader movement  ('new reading') from Piteå, however, was influenced by the 19th-century Nyevangelism ('New Evangelism') and free church movements with roots in the Moravian Church. Historian  has stated that by 1840, "the terms  and Methodist were practically interchangeable".

Priest Frederik Thorelius noted the  could only attend church infrequently due to the distance. They were people living in rural areas, far from the high churches of the state church organization, regularly holding meetings to study the Bible and Christian material, and commonly abstaining from vices such as drinking, dancing, and swearing.

The meetings were described by Thorelius:

However, as also noted in the London Quarterly Review in 1869, there was a "great diversity in sentiment and practice obtained amongst ." As another book states regarding Readers such as Gerhard Gerhardsson and the use of literature, "the hitherto customary books of edification were rejected, and only the Bible and Luther's writings were adhered to, though only as much of the great Reformer's utterances was adopted as suited the association's antinomian form of confession."

Norrland Reader movement 
The Norrland region and its revival were to play a significant part in the country's religious history. Originally an orthodox Lutheran movement, the New Reader movement began in Piteå, gaining more Pietist and Moravian influence by the late 1700s and reaching its peak between 1810 and 1850. 1805 is described as a key moment, when soldier Erik Stålberg "who, instead of the older Readers recognizing no other order of salvation than a thorough conversion, a living faith and a daily sanctification, claimed that the saving faith could be found even in those in whose hearts the love of the world and sin were still unbroken, and declared the law not further binding on those who had been justified by faith." By the 1810s, the movement had spread from Piteå to Luleå, Neder-Kalix, Skellefteå, and Arvidsjaur. Priest Anders Rosenius, father of Pietist preacher Carl Olof Rosenius, was part of the movement at this time.

Among its leaders were Pehr Brandell (1781–1841), Olof Palmgren (1783–1814),  in Norrlångträsk (1794–1876) and Gerhard Gerhardsson (1792–1878). Larsson was known to express himself forcefully, stating:

The movement's leaders faced problems with the authorities. Larsson was threatened with exile and the death penalty for his preaching. Palmgren stood trial in 1812 and was forced to pay a fine for violating the Conventicle Act. In 1818, the Readers filed complaints to the diocese about the clergy in Skellefteå. Priest  was instructed by Bishop  to meet with them, allowing them to ask questions. Despite his lack of official schooling, Gerhardsson brought a statement of faith he had written expounding on the New Readers' beliefs, consisting of 22 articles on 24 pages, based on the format of the Augsburg Confession. Hambræus in the end sided with his colleagues. Almqvist, while politically supporting fines for the Readers, maintained a conciliatory tone and opposed stronger measures against them.

Larsson and Gerhardsson stood trial in 1819 in the Skellefteå Church for rebellious activity and disobedience to priests, bishops and the service order, and for violating the Conventicle Act. Like Bishop Almqvist, he took a conciliatory tone, speaking with the movement's leaders. Due to Sylvander's efforts, starting in 1820 they were again allowed to assemble for devotions on Sundays and holidays; however, their own interpretation of the biblical text was not allowed. On 9 January 1822, King Charles XIV John decreed that the provisions of the Conventicle Act were no longer to apply to the Readers in Västerbotten. As long as they did not gather during public worship services, they were allowed to hold their own devotions and individual meetings.

The books were partly in opposition to the state church's hymnal and were commonly used by conventicle groups at the time. The hymns themselves had a "popular, emotionally saturated" tone, which Gerhardsson felt preached a false gospel. Gerhardsson would later distance himself from Moravian influence and become a follower of priest Henric Schartau.

Among the Readers, women spoke and preached. Maria Elisabeth (known as Maja-Lisa) Söderlund was one of the women who was widely known in northern Västerbotten. She traveled from town to town, often reciting Luther's sermons from memory. She was a close friend of Carl Olof Rosenius, who would later become one of the leaders of the Evangeliska Fosterlands-Stiftelsen (EFS, Swedish Evangelical Mission), and had a great impact on his spiritual development. A number of spiritual sayings and advice in his book  are attributed to her, as well as an excerpt printed in the February 1844 edition of his publication Pietisten.

Reader movements in other countries 
Pietism spread throughout the Germanic-speaking part of Europe. The term reader, however, seems to be specifically Nordic. In Norway, the word often denotes a specific reader movement, the Haugean movement. Laestadianism has its roots in the Reader movement as well through Pehr Brandell's preaching.

Legacy 
The Reader movement's rebellion and free thought have a connection with the later labor movement. A dramatic performance by Greger Ottosson entitled , about Reader preachers Gerhard Gerhardsson and Anders Larsson, was presented in 2011. Ottosson and others have noted that the movement, with its right to preach and interpret for oneself, paved the way for today's democratic Sweden.

See also 
 Anna Johansdotter Norbäck – female religious leader influenced by the Readers
 Fredrik Gabriel Hedberg – Finnish priest with related Hedbergianism movement
 Eric Jansson – Reader preacher who founded a utopian sect in the United States
 Lars Levi Laestadius – founder of Laestadianism, connected to the Readers through his mother
 Karin Olofsdotter – connected to Mårten Thunberg's sect
 Henric Schartau – priest whose works influenced the movement
 Biblical literalism

References

Further reading 
 
 

Christian theological movements
Christian terminology
18th-century Lutheranism
Lutheran revivals
1700s in Sweden
1800s in Sweden
Pietism
Radical Pietism